Čista ljubav, is a Croatian television drama. The show was created by Nataša Buljan and first broadcast on Nova TV on 10 September 2017.

Cast 

2010s Croatian television series
Croatian television soap operas
2017 Croatian television series debuts
2018 Croatian television series endings
2010s television soap operas
Nova TV (Croatia) original programming